Meiyyazhagi is a 2013 Indian Tamil-language drama film directed by RT Jayavel and starring Balaji, Arjun and Jai Quehaeni. The film is about the love between a sister and her brother, who is affected by cerebral palsy.

Cast 
Balaji as Deva
Arjun as Partha
Jai Quehaeni as Meiyyazhagi
Arunmozhi Varman
Ramraj as Arjun's father
Velmurugan in a cameo appearance

Soundtrack 
The music is composed by S. P. Balasubrahmanyam's son Abhishek.
"En Pera Naane Maruntheneda Unna Nenachu"

Reception 
A critic from The Times of India gave the film a rating of one-and-a-half out of five stars and wrote that "The problem with Meiyyazhagi is that it is 30 years too late". A critic from Dinamalar gave the film a mixed review and said that the screenplay could have been handled better and that Balaji overacted while praising the film's music and cinematography. On the contrary, a critic from The Hindu praised the director's treatment of the storyline, the lead actors' performance and the music.

References

External links 
 

2010s Tamil-language films
2013 drama films
2013 films
Films about disability in India
Indian drama films